The Lovers is a musical by Laura Murphy based on William Shakespeare's A Midsummer Night's Dream.

Premise 
The Lovers is described as a fresh and magical pop-infused reimagining that refocuses the story with a modern perspective and questions our enduring search for true love.

Production 
The original production was performed from 23 October to 20 November 2022 at the Sydney Opera House, presented by Bell Shakespeare. Directed by Shaun Rennie, the original production featured a live four-piece band. It is the first musical performed by Bell Shakespeare.

Reception 
The musical was generally well received, being described as "a thrilling piece of theatre" and "a great time".

Awards 
It was nominated for Best Production of a Musical and Best Performance in a Supporting Role in a Musical (Natalie Abbott) at the 2022 Sydney Theatre Awards.

Musical numbers

Act I
"A Story About Love" – Oberon and the Lovers
"Love and Pop and Shakespeare" – Company and the Fairy Band
"Happy Be Theseus" – Company
"Perfect Little Princess" – Company
"Overfull of Self Affairs" – Company
"Start Over" – Lysander and Hermia
"Here Comes Helena" – Lysander, Hermia, and Helena
"Chasing My Tail" – Helena
"Down To Love" – Oberon
"The Magic Touch" – Puck, Oberon, and the Fairy Band
"I Am Invisible" – Oberon
"Helena Follows Her Nose" – Helena and Demetrius
"What I Cannot Have" – Demetrius, Helena, and the Fairy Band
"Chasing My Tail" (Reprise) – Helena and Oberon
"Hast Thou The Flower There?" – Oberon and Puck
"Euphoria" – Oberon
"The Magic Touch" (Reprise) – Oberon and Puck
"Wrap Around You" – Hermia, Lysander, and the Fairy Band
"Puck's Spell" – Puck
"What I Cannot Chase" – Helena and Demetrius
"Lysander Is In Love" – Lysander
"Keen Mockery" – Helena and Lysander
"Hiss Hiss Bitch" – Snake and Snake Minions
"Cruel Prey" – Hermia, Snake, and Snake Minions
"To Die For" – The Lovers

Act II
"Down To Love" (Reprise) – Oberon, Puck, and the Fairy Band
"Gimme Gimme" – The Lovers
"Thou Hast Mistaken Quite" – Oberon, Puck, Demetrius, and Hermia
"Euphoria" (Reprise) – Oberon
"What I Cannot Have" (Reprise) – Demetrius
"Oberon's Spell" – Oberon
"Gimme Gimme" (Reprise) – Oberon, Puck, Lysander, and Helena
"Demetrius Is In Love" – Demetrius
"Gimme Gimme A Boy Fight" – The Lovers
"Injurious Hermia!" – The Lovers and Snake
"Diss Diss Bitch" – Company
"How To Love" – Company
"Start Over" (Reprise) – The Lovers
"Down To Love" (Finale) – Company and the Fairy Band

Principal cast

References 

2022 musicals
Australian musicals
Musicals based on plays
Plays and musicals based on A Midsummer Night's Dream